Antonio González Orozco (May 10, 1933 – June 10, 2020) was a Mexican muralist.

Life
Orozco was born on May 10, 1933, in Chihuahua. He was trained by Diego Rivera at the Academy of San Carlos in the 1950s.

Orozco painted murals at the National Palace. He also restored Chapultepec Castle in Mexico City, where he painted two new murals. He exhibited his work in Mexico and internationally.

Orozco died of cancer on June 10, 2020, in Mexico City, at age 87.

References

1933 births
2020 deaths
Artists from Chihuahua (state)
Mexican muralists
Mexican male painters
Deaths from cancer in Mexico
20th-century Mexican painters
21st-century Mexican painters
20th-century Mexican male artists
21st-century Mexican male artists